Jan Roelofs is a Grand Prix motorcycle racer from the Netherlands.

Career statistics

By season

Races by year
(key)

References

External links
 
 Racesport.nl Article (NED)
 DueRuote.it Article (IT)
 DueRuote.it Article (IT)
 Shutteshock.com Article

1985 births
Living people
Dutch motorcycle racers
250cc World Championship riders
21st-century Dutch people